Bayou Talla is a stream in the U.S. state of Mississippi. It is a tributary to the Jourdan River.

Talla is a name derived from the Choctaw language meaning "palmetto".

References

Rivers of Mississippi
Rivers of Hancock County, Mississippi
Mississippi placenames of Native American origin